Unquera is a village with 803 inhabitants (INE 2005) in the municipality of Val de San Vicente, in the west of the province of Cantabria, Spain.  Sitting on the ría de Tina Menor, at the mouth of the River Deva it borders Asturias. It is famous throughout Spain for its pies of Unquera. Unquera is also known as the entrance to the Hermida gorge, the most usual way to access the Liébana district, which has become the main throughway of the town. This route is also part of the Camino Lebaniego, which links the Caminos de Santiago of the North and French route.

The population depends in part on Pesués, the municipal capital, where the town hall, the barracks of the Guardia Civil and the primary school are located.

History 
During the Old Regime, the municipality of Val de San Vicente belonged to nobles of the house of the Marquises de Aguilar de Campoo. However, Unquera as a locality has a very short life historically by European calculations. It did not appear on the map of Coello until(1861), although the  Unquera Cove  is mentioned in the Tina Mayor estuary. Unquera may have developed at the end of the 19th century thanks to the improvement of communications, especially by the railroad, and for the commercial boom of the region, possible after the opening of the gorge road (later N-621) in 1863. This road was used as a way to export, through the Unquera inlet, raw materials from Liébana and the La Hermida gorge to England, Belgium and (Germany). In 1881 Unquera is already cited as a village at the bottom of Tina Mayor. Since then Unquera has grown linearly around the road, and also parallel to the estuary, where it has a river walk.

Economy 
The food industry stands out for the main industry, represented mainly by the brand  Pindal  (others being others such as  Canal  and  Sanbar ). Canneries in this industry has existed since the 19th century in Unquera and are still maintaining active manufacturing of preserves and pickling.

Transportation 

Unquera has the following ground transportation:
 Line of FEVE, which links the population with Santander and with Asturias.
 Autovía del Cantábrico, one of whose accesses is located next to the town.
 Bus lines, among which stands out the line of ALSA Irún – Santiago de Compostela, which takes Unquera as one of its stops
 Road N-621, which links León and Unquera, the most usual route to access Potes and the only one from the coast Cantabrian.

Towns in Spain
Municipalities in Cantabria